Rabaulichthys altipinnis, the sailfin anthias, is a species of ray-finned fish within the family Serranidae. The species grows to a length of 6 centimeters, with 10 dorsal spines, 15 to 16 dorsal soft rays, 3 anal spines, and 6 to 7 anal soft rays. It is found in the western Pacific Ocean off of New Britain, Indonesia and Australia.

Habitat & biology 
Rabaulichthys altipinnis lives in reef environments at depths of 30 to 40 meters below sea level. It lives near coral rubble and steep coral slopes on the outer region of reefs. Groups are typically found with 3 to 8 individuals. The diet consists of brine shrimp, nauplii and mysis.

Conservation 
Rabaulichthys altipinnis has been classified as 'Least concern' by the IUCN Red List. No special conservation efforts have been made so far, and its range already overlaps with marine protected areas off of Bird's Head Peninsula.

References 

Lieske, E. and R. Myers, 1994. Collins Pocket Guide. Coral reef fishes. Indo-Pacific & Caribbean including the Red Sea. Haper Collins Publishers, 400 p. 

Fish described in 1984
Taxa named by Gerald R. Allen
Fish of the Pacific Ocean
Least concern biota of Australia
Fish of Australia
Fish of Indonesia
Fish of Papua New Guinea
Serranidae